Ridiculous is an album by the British new wave group Squeeze. It was the band's eleventh studio album, and it introduced their latest drummer Kevin Wilkinson (no relation to bassist Keith Wilkinson). As on the previous album, Some Fantastic Place, the band recorded one song penned by Keith Wilkinson. This time, however, Wilkinson did not perform the lead vocals. That song, "Got to Me", is the last Wilkinson would write with Squeeze. Chris Difford sang lead on two songs, "Long Face" and "Fingertips". He had not performed lead on an album cut since "Slaughtered, Gutted and Heartbroken" and "Love Circles" on the 1989 album Frank. This record was produced by Glenn Tilbrook and Peter Smith.

The album spent one week at number 50 in the UK Albums Chart.

Music
A clear distinction, noted by Stephen Thomas Erlewine, between Ridiculous and predecessors such as Play and Some Fantastic Place was a "stripped-down, matter of fact production", giving the record a "crisper and livelier" feel. Erlewine compared the "jangling" style of "Grouch of the Day" with that of the 1965 Beatles album Rubber Soul.

Reception 

Stephen Thomas Erlewine of AllMusic gave a primarily praising summary of Ridiculous, commenting that it "stands as a testament to the enduring quality of their craft" and was "every bit as enjoyable" as their other post-reunion efforts.

In August 1996, Alex Diamond of PopEntertainment.com proclaimed Ridiculous to possibly be "the band's best overall album since 1981's East Side Story".

Track listing
All songs written by Chris Difford and Glenn Tilbrook except as indicated.
 "Electric Trains" – 4:03
 "Heaven Knows" – 4:34
 "Grouch of the Day" – 3:27
 "Walk Away" – 4:43
 "This Summer" – 3:39
 "Got to Me" (Keith Wilkinson) – 3:45
 "Long Face" – 4:31
 "I Want You" – 4:03
 "Daphne" – 3:44
 "Lost for Words" – 1:59
 "Great Escape" – 3:27
 "Temptation for Love" – 3:37
 "Sound Asleep" – 4:38
 "Fingertips" – 5:40

Personnel
Squeeze
 Chris Difford – guitars, backing vocals, lead vocals on "Long Face" and "Fingertips"
 Glenn Tilbrook – keyboards, guitars, lead and backing vocals
 Keith Wilkinson – bass, backing vocals
 Kevin Wilkinson – drums, cymbals 

with:
 Chris Braide – backing vocals
 Cathy Dennis – co-lead vocals on "Temptation for Love"
 Jon Savannah – keyboards on "Walk Away"

Production
 Glenn Tilbrook – producer 
 Peter Smith – producer, arrangements 
 Squeeze – arrangements
 Barry Hammond – engineer 
 Ben Darlow – assistant engineer 
 Mark "Spike" Stent – mixing 
 Alan Douglas – mix assistant 
 Jegs – mix assistant 
 Kevin Shaw – design

References

External links
 Album summary

Squeeze (band) albums
1995 albums
Albums produced by Glenn Tilbrook